Vianney is the second studio album from French singer-songwriter Vianney. It was released on 25 November 2016 by Tôt ou tard. The album includes the singles "Je m'en vais", "Moi aimer toi", "Dumbo", "Le Fils à papa" and "J'm'en fous". The album has peaked at number 1 on the French Albums Chart.

Singles
"Je m'en vais" was released as the lead single from the album on 17 October 2016. The song has peaked at number 2 on the French Singles Chart, the song has also charted in Belgium and Switzerland. "Moi aimer toi" was released as the second single from the album on 13 March 2017. The song has peaked at number 24 on the French Singles Chart, the song has also charted in Belgium. "Dumbo" was released as the third single from the album on 4 July 2017. The song has peaked at number 151 on the French Singles Chart, the song has also charted in Belgium. "Le Fils à papa" was released as the fourth single from the album on 16 February 2018. The song charted in Belgium. "J'm'en fous" was released as the fifth and final single from the album on 17 August 2018. The song has peaked at number 153 on the French Singles Chart.

Track listing

Charts

Weekly charts

Year-end charts

Certifications

Release history

References

2016 albums
Vianney (singer) albums